Abra de Ilog, officially the Municipality of Abra de Ilog,  is a 2nd class municipality in the province of , Philippines. According to the 2020 census, it has a population of 35,176 people.

Abra de Ilog is classified as partially urban.

History
Abra de Ilog was formerly a small settlement founded by Spanish religious missionaries sometime in the early part of the 17th century. According to folk history, its former name was Abre de Ilog. The name was derived from the Spanish verb abrir (to open) and the Tagalog noun ilog (river). Later on, the name evolved into its present name: Abra de Ilog, a Chabacano-like terminology which can be loosely translated as bucana ng ilog, or "opening of the river." This can be attributed to the numerous rivers and creeks that traverses strategic areas of the municipality.

In 1902, during the American Occupation the town was officially organized. Abra de Ilog's first "municipal president" was Rosaleo Miciano. But with the passage of Republic Act No. 1280 (An Act Reducing the Fifteen (15) Municipalities of Occidental Mindoro into Eight (8) Municipalities) on January 4, 1905, Abra de Ilog was made a barrio of the Municipality of Mamburao.

Five years later, in 1910, Abra de Ilog regained its status as a municipality. On June 13, 1950, the government approved Republic Act 505 dividing Mindoro into two new provinces: Oriental Mindoro and Occidental Mindoro. The new province of Occidental Mindoro comprised the municipalities of Abra de Ilog, Looc, Lubang, Mamburao (now the capital of Occidental Mindoro), Paluan, Sablayan, San José and Santa Cruz.

Geography

Barangays
Abra de Ilog is politically subdivided into 10 barangays. The newest barangay, Santa Maria was created in 2014 from Wawa.

Climate

Demographics

Economy

References

External links

Abra de Ilog Profile at PhilAtlas.com
MUNICIPALITY OF ABRA DE ILOG
[ Philippine Standard Geographic Code]
Philippine Census Information
Local Governance Performance Management System

Municipalities of Occidental Mindoro